Hersey is both a surname and a given name. Notable people with the name include:

Surname:
David Hersey (born 1939), American lighting designer
Derek Hersey (1956–1993), British rock climber
Ira G. Hersey (1858–1943), politician from the U.S. state of Maine
John Hersey (1914–1993), American writer
Kathleen Hersey (born 1990), American swimmer
Mark L. Hersey (1863–1934), United States Army officer
Mayo D. Hersey (1886–1978), American engineer
Samuel F. Hersey (1812–1875), politician from the U.S. state of Maine
Thayer David, born David Thayer Hersey (1927–1978), American actor

Given name:
Hersey Hawkins (born 1966), former American professional basketball player
Hersey Kyota, Palau politician 
William Hersey Hopkins (1841–1919), American academic and college administrator

Companies:

 Hersey & Son, Silversmiths